Sir Harry Barnston, 1st Baronet, JP, DL (December 1870 – 22 February 1929) was a British Conservative politician.

The son of Major William Barnston of Crewe Hill, and Mary Emma King, he was educated privately and at Christ Church, Oxford. He was unsuccessful parliamentary candidate at Stockport in 1906 and sat for Eddisbury, Cheshire from 1910 until his death. He served in government as Comptroller of the Household from 1921 to 1924, and from November 1924 – January 1928.

Honours
He was created a baronet of Churton in the County of Chester on 1 March 1924.

On his death in 1929 the baronetcy became extinct.

References

External links
 

1870 births
1929 deaths
Conservative Party (UK) MPs for English constituencies
UK MPs 1910–1918
UK MPs 1918–1922
UK MPs 1922–1923
UK MPs 1923–1924
UK MPs 1924–1929
Alumni of Christ Church, Oxford
Baronets in the Baronetage of the United Kingdom